The Bainbridge reflex or Bainbridge effect, also called the atrial reflex, is an increase in heart rate due to an increase in central venous pressure. Increased blood volume is detected by stretch receptors (Cardiac Receptors) located in both sides of atria at the venoatrial junctions.

History
Francis Arthur Bainbridge described this as a reflex in 1918 when he was experimenting on dogs. Bainbridge found that infusing blood or saline into the animal increased heart rate. This phenomenon occurred even if arterial blood pressure did not increase. He further observed that heart rate increased when venous pressure rose high enough to distend the right atrium, but denervation of the vagi to the heart eliminated these effects. 
Subsequent work demonstrated that a stretch-induced increase in cardiac beating rate can also be observed in isolated hearts or even the fully separated SAN. Thus, the positive chronotropic (from Χρόνος, Greek for 'time', and τρέπειν, Greek for 'to bend/turn') response of the heart to stretch must, in part, at least, be caused and accomplished by mechanisms located within the SAN. This led to the suggestion to refer to the response discovered by Bainbrindge as an 'effect, rather than a 'reflex'.

Mechanism of Action
Increased blood volume results in increased  venous return to the heart, which leads to increased firing of B-fibers. B-fibers send signals to the brain (the afferent pathway of the neural portion of the Bainbridge reflex), which then modulates both sympathetic and parasympathetic pathways to the SA node of the heart (the efferent pathway of the neural portion of the Bainbridge reflex), causing an increase in heart rate. "Effects on cardiac contractility and stroke volume are insignificant." Bainbridge reflex can be blocked by atropine and can be abolished by cutting the vagus nerve.
The local response of sino-atrial node pacemaker cells to stretch involves stretch-activated ion channels, as was demonstrated by stretching single isolated pacemaker cells while recording their cellular electrical activity.

Control of heart rate

The Bainbridge reflex and the baroreceptor reflex control heart rate. The baroreceptor reflex can correct for a change in arterial pressure by increasing or decreasing heart rate. In contrast, the Bainbridge reflex responds to changes in blood volume. The Bainbridge reflex is seen in dogs, but experiment has shown that it is not as significant in primates. There is evidence, however, that the Bainbridge reflex does occur in humans, as in after delivery of an infant when a large volume (up to 800 mL) of uteroplacental blood is put back into the mother's circulation, resulting in tachycardia

Venous return

As venous return increases, the pressure in the superior and inferior vena cava increase. This results in an increase in the pressure of the right atrium, which stimulates the atrial stretch receptors (low pressure receptor zones). These receptors in turn signal the medullary control centers to increase the heart rate (Tachycardia). Unusually, this tachycardia is mediated by increased sympathetic activity to the sinoatrial node (SAN) with no fall in parasympathetic activity.

Increasing the heart rate serves to decrease the pressure in the superior and inferior venae cavae by drawing more blood out of the right atrium. This results in a decrease in atrial pressure, which serves to bring in more blood from the vena cavae, resulting in a decrease in the venous pressure of the great veins. This continues until right atrial blood pressure returns to normal levels, upon which the heart rate decreases to its original level.

Respiratory Sinus Arrhythmia

Bainbridge Reflex is involved in Respiratory Sinus Arrhythmia. During inhalation intrathoracic pressure decreases. It triggers increased venous return which is registered by stretch receptors, which via Bainbridge Reflex increases the heart rate momentarily during inspiration. This is not to be confused with stage 4 of the Valsalva maneuver, in which the release of high intrathoracic pressure previously generated by forced expiration against a closed glottis, now restores venous return and cardiac output into a vasoconstricted circulation, stimulating the vagus nerve and leading to a slowing of the heart, or bradycardia.

See also

 Low pressure receptor zones
 High pressure receptor zones

References

Berne, R., Levy, M., Koeppen, B., & Stanton, B. (2004) Physiology, Fifth Edition. Elsevier, Inc.

Cardiovascular physiology
Reflexes